The 1932 Bahamas hurricane, also known as the Great Abaco hurricane of 1932, was a large and powerful Category 5 hurricane that struck the Bahamas at peak intensity. The fourth tropical storm and third hurricane in the 1932 Atlantic hurricane season, it was also one of two Category 5 hurricanes in the Atlantic Ocean that year, the other being the 1932 Cuba hurricane. The 1932 Bahamas hurricane originated north of the Virgin Islands, became a strong hurricane, and passed over the northern Bahamas before recurving. The storm never made landfall on the continental United States, but its effects were felt in the northeast part of the country and in the Bahamas, especially on the Abaco Islands, where damage was very great. To date, it is one of four Category 5 Atlantic hurricanes to make landfall in the Bahamas at that intensity, the others having occurred in 1933, 1992, and 2019.

Meteorological history

The system was first detected just to the north of the Virgin Islands as a tropical depression late on August 30. The storm moved generally west-northwest, passing to the north of the Greater Antilles and Grand Turk on the night of September 2–3. It reached minimal hurricane intensity as it passed near the Turks and Caicos Islands, and began a period of rapid strengthening shortly thereafter.

The storm passed just to the east of the main islands and Nassau while continuing to strengthen. Maintaining strength, the storm passed over Great Abaco on September 5 and gradually began to curve northeast away from the mainland United States. The storm became extratropical on September 9, crossed south of the Avalon Peninsula, Newfoundland and Labrador, on September 11, and eventually passed near the Snæfellsnes, Iceland, and Jan Mayen. The storm's remnants then turned eastward, eventually dissipating over the Barents Sea on September 17.

Preparations
Initially, storm warnings in the United States were placed at 15:00 UTC on September 5 from Daytona Beach, Florida, to Punta Gorda, Florida. Due to the warnings, residents in the affected areas began boarding up windows and completing other preparations.  As the cyclone later appeared to miss South Florida, the first warnings were cancelled and new storm warnings issued between Daytona Beach and Wilmington, North Carolina. By early September 7, warnings were extended up the Eastern Seaboard to Eastport, Maine.

Impact
16 people were reported killed, along with an additional 300 injured. This entire toll occurred in the Bahamas, notably on and around Abaco Island; damage estimates in dollars, however, were not released. Despite the large size and great intensity of the hurricane, ample warnings prevented loss of life and commerce at sea.

Bahamas

The storm was very destructive on Abaco Island, where the reported barometric pressure was below . At Hope Town, strong winds shifting from northeast to southeast destroyed 83 homes and severely damaged 63. Food supplies ran low and salt contaminated the drinking supply. All public buildings along with the radio station were destroyed. The lowest pressure at Hope Town was  around 15:00 UTC on September 5. At nearby Marsh Harbour, northeast winds shifted to southwest at 20:00 UTC and calm conditions occurred for 15 minutes as the eye passed. On Green Turtle Cay, near Abaco Island, north and northwest winds coincided with the worst conditions; a large storm surge inundated the island, all buildings and the graveyard were destroyed, and at least six people died with 25 injuries reported. At nearby Coopers Town, just six homes survived the storm. Only four homes were still standing on Great Guana Cay. Newspaper reports and photos helped to establish estimated prevailing winds on Green Turtle Cay that possibly exceeded  during the hurricane.

United States
Although storm warnings were posted for the Florida and eastern United States coastline, the storm's recurvature prevented a landfall, leaving the main effects as heavy coastal swells and high winds. Gale-force winds affected the coastline, however. Strong gales on the evening of September 7 caused the Cape Lookout Lightship to be blown loose from her anchorage. United States Coast Guard cutters from Fort Lauderdale, Florida, were dispatched to her assistance. Large trees and signs fell down in Brooklyn, New York, due to high winds. Cold temperatures followed in the wake of the hurricane.

Newfoundland, Iceland, and Jan Mayen Island
Although the storm was extratropical by the time it bypassed Newfoundland and was near Iceland and Jan Mayen Island, it was still intense: observed barometric pressures were at or below .

See also

List of Category 5 Atlantic hurricanes
Tropical cyclone effects in Europe
Hurricanes in the Bahama Archipelago
1899 San Ciriaco hurricane – A destructive, long-lived Category 4 hurricane that took a similar path, devastating the Bahamas
Hurricane Joaquin (2015) – A Category 4 hurricane that struck similar areas of the Bahamas, causing widespread damage
Hurricane Dorian (2019) – A Category 5 hurricane that became the strongest to ever strike the Bahamas causing widespread destruction

References

Sources
 September 1932 issue of the Monthly Weather Review
 Unisys tracking information for 1932

Bahamas Hurricane, 1932
1932
Hurricanes in the Bahamas
Hurricanes in North Carolina
Hurricanes in Canada
Bahamas